Tasmin Mahfuz (born May 28, 1987) is an American television journalist and news anchor. In December 2015, Mahfuz, a Gracie award recipient, joined WDVM, formerly known as WHAG, as an evening news anchor, making her the first Bengali-American woman to anchor a nightly newscast.

Early life and education
Mahfuz was born and raised in Florida, the daughter of Abdul and Nazmun Mahfuz. Her parents are both of Bangladeshi descent. Her father, Abdul, is a businessman and philanthropist, emigrated to the United States in 1979 when he was 19 years old from Chittagong, Bangladesh. One of his many charitable projects includes an all-girls high school in Chandanaish, Bangladesh, for rural girls to receive an education, which otherwise was impossible for women in the area due to distance and poverty. Currently, a college is in the planning and development stages adjacent to the high school. Nazmun produced and hosted weekly television shows for South Florida's PBS and WLRN.

She attended high school at The King's Academy in West Palm Beach and went on to complete a Bachelor's degree in international relations from Emory University in 2009. Following her graduation, Mahfuz took part in a two-year internship at the United Nations.

Career
In 2012, she joined Ebru TV, an international network, and reported from New Jersey, New York City and Washington, DC. Her assignments included covering the devastation after Hurricane Sandy in Sandy Hook shooting and the New Jersey in Newtown, Connecticut. Mahfuz reported from the United Nations, providing Breaking news from the UN General Assembly, on US–Iran relations, the Crimean annexation and developments in Syria.

In August 2014, Mahfuz joined ABC 4 Utah as a reporter/ Southern Utah Bureau Chief. She launched the station's first TV news bureau in St. George and was responsible for covering 20,000 square miles with a population of over 200,000 people by herself.

Mahfuz joined WDVM-TV in December 2015 as a full-time evening news anchor.  She anchors the weeknight news from 5–5:30 pm, 6–8 p.m. and 10–11:30 p.m. to audiences in the Washington DC market, which includes Maryland, Northern Virginia and regions within West Virginia and Pennsylvania.

Awards
Mahfuz won the Alliance of Women in Media's Gracie Award for Outstanding Producer in TV news in June 2015. The Society of Professional Journalists – Utah Chapter presented Mahfuz an award for her reports as a multimedia journalist in 2015. In 2015 and 2017, the Federation of Bangladeshi Associations in North America recognized Mahfuz for her work in mainstream journalism as a 2nd generation Bengali-American.

References

1987 births
Living people
People from West Palm Beach, Florida
Emory University alumni
American women television journalists
20th-century American women
21st-century American women
21st-century American journalists